The Tech Aero TR 200 is a French homebuilt aerobatic aircraft that was designed and produced by Tech Aero of Glisolles, first flown in August 1988. When it was available the aircraft was supplied as a kit for amateur construction.

Design and development
Designed as a trainer for the unlimited class, the TR 200 features a cantilever low-wing, a two-seats-in-tandem enclosed cockpit under a bubble canopy, fixed conventional landing gear with wheel pants and a single engine in tractor configuration.

The aircraft is made from wood.

The manufacturer estimated the construction time from the supplied kit as 800 hours.

Specifications (TR 200)

See also
List of aerobatic aircraft

References

External links
 Photo of a TR 200

TR 200
1980s French sport aircraft
Single-engined tractor aircraft
Homebuilt aircraft
Aerobatic aircraft
High-wing aircraft
Aircraft first flown in 1988